Jean-Luc Bergen (born 8 December 1988), known as Jean-Luc, is an Aruban footballer who plays as a MidfielderStriker for Aruban Division di Honor club RCA and a former member of the Aruba national football team. 

In his club career, he played for RCA, VSV TONEGIDO, FC Boshuizen. In 2011, Bergen was selected for the Aruba national team, and debuted against St. Lucia on 12 July 2011, with a 4-2 defeat for the 2014 FIFA World Cup qualification in Brazil. In a 6-6 aggregate, he successfully scored a penalty goal in the penalty shootout, in an eventual defeat to St. Lucia. He also appeared at the 2018 FIFA World Cup qualification in Russia, where on 8 September 2015, he played there against St. Vincent and the Grenadines in a 2-1 victory.

In 2012 he won the 3rd edition of the ABCS tournament with the national team.

Honours
RCA
Aruban Division di Honor: 2014–15, 2015–16, 2018–19,
Torneo Copa Betico Croes: 2015-16, 2019-20, 2020-21, 2021-22
Aruba
ABCS Tournament: 2012

References

External links
 
 

1988 births
Living people
Aruban footballers
Aruba international footballers
Association football forwards
Aruba under-20 international footballers
Aruba youth international footballers
People from Oranjestad, Aruba
VSV TONEGIDO players